A European lawyer, beyond the self-evident definition of 'a lawyer in Europe', also refers to a specific definition introduced by the UK's European Communities (Services of Lawyers) Order 1978, which permits lawyers from other EU member states to practice law within the UK, in accordance with EU directive 77/249/EEC.

The term EU lawyer is also used in UK law.

The order contains a list of countries of origin and the designations which the order applies to for example a professional "entitled to pursue his professional activities" such as an "advokat" in Finland, may practice Europe-wide as a "European lawyer".

The order also imposes temporary limitations on the types of legal work which may be carried out by such persons. Lawyers from other European countries practicing in the UK must be associated with appropriate co-counsel and upon demand by a competent authority they must verify their status.

After a possible temporary limitation such as the aforementioned, EU lawyers may acquire and use the title of the country they reside and work in, usually after three years of practice under the title of origin (and possible restrictions) or after an examination that confirms equivalence. The choice is up to the professional, not the bar or country.

Professions Applicable to EU Order
The full list of professions to whom the title 'European Lawyer' is applicable follows;

See also
 Counsel
 List of European countries

Notes

Lawyers by type
European Union law